The 1990 Swedish Golf Tour was the seventh season of the Swedish Golf Tour, a series of professional golf tournaments held in Sweden and Finland.

All the tournaments also featured on the 1990 Challenge Tour.

Schedule
The season consisted of 14 events played between May and September.

Order of Merit

References

Swedish Golf Tour